Kelly Donnelly (formerly Kelly Beckett) is a British professional singer, actress, TV host and activist. She is best known as a member of the musical group Paradiso Girls and more recently as a TV host on Style Network, G4 and ENTV - where she is known as "Fuzzy" and covers everything from the Grammys to the Oscars. In June 2018 she announced the launch of her new music project under the stage name A Girl Called She. The first single and video "I AM SHE" was released 30 Oct 2018.

Early life
Donnelly was born in Nottingham, Nottinghamshire, England, of Barbadian heritage. She received a musical theatre diploma from Midlands Academy of Dance and Drama and trained at the Actor's Temple in London.

Career
Kelly was signed straight out of college by Simon Fuller and 19 Management to host a kids' TV show S Club TV. In 2007, Donnelly joined the musical group Paradiso Girls, after auditioning in London. The Los Angeles-based girl group was signed to will.i.am Music Group/Interscope Records. The Paradiso Girls released their debut single "Patron Tequila", featuring Lil Jon and Eve in April 2009, which reached number 3 on the Billboard's Hot Dance Club chart. The girls were also featured in a remix of the will.i.am song "I Got It from My Mama".

Donnelly currently hosts liveAttack of the Show! and pre-recorded TV shows for the G4 Network owned by NBC Universal. She is the new face and host of all fashion and entertainment news at ENTV covering everything from The Golden Globes to The Grammys and The Oscars. She is also a regular fashion host on the Style Network.

A Girl Called She describes her music as epic pro women indie pop.

References

External links 
 

English television actresses
Living people
People from Nottingham
English female dancers
English television presenters
21st-century Black British women singers
British people of Barbadian descent
Year of birth missing (living people)
Paradiso Girls members